The 1992 British Formula Three season was the 42nd British Formula Three Championship, won by Brazilian Gil de Ferran. The season started on 22 March at Donington Park and ended on 4 October at Silverstone following sixteen races. Dutch driver Marcel Albers died following a large crash during the third round at Thruxton. 1992 was the final season of British F3 in which the champion did not drive a Dallara chassis, and the first of six titles in seven years for Paul Stewart Racing. Class B was won by British driver Paul Evans.

Drivers and Teams
The following teams and drivers were competitors in the 1991 season. Class B is for older Formula Three cars.

Race calendar and results

 Round 3 was shortened due to the fatal crash of Albers. Negri and Westwood set identical fastest lap times and were subsequently both awarded an additional point.

Championship Standings

Points in brackets include dropped scores - only the best 13 of 16 scores count towards the championship

References
AUTOCOURSE 1992-93

External links
 The official website of the British Formula 3 Championship

Formula Three
British Formula Three Championship seasons